The Essen Feather is an award for German-style board games, given at the Deutscher Spiele Preis ceremony at the Spiel game fair in Essen, Germany.  The award is given to games with well-written rules, as it was felt that too many good games were spoiled by incomprehensible rules.

The trophy is a brass goose quill and inkwell on a chessboard.

Winners
1981 Focus
1982 Dark Tower
1983 Giganten
1984 Inka
1985 Wildlife Adventure
1986 Das Blaue Amulett
1987 Spy & Spy
1988 Holiday AG
1989 No game was found worthy of the award
1990 Lifestyle
1991 Hotu Matua
1992 Coco Crazy
1993 Acquire
1994 New Games in Old Rome (German: Neue Spiele im Alten Rom)
1995 The Settlers of Catan
1996 Detroit-Cleveland Grand Prix (German: Top Race)
1997 Mississippi Queen
1998 Die Macher
1999 Union Pacific
2000 Taj Mahal
2001 Entdecker
2002 Puerto Rico
2003 Alhambra
2004 Fifth Avenue
2005 Piranha Pedro
2006 Nacht der Magier
2007 Chateau Roquefort
2008 Jamaica
2009 Diamonds Club
2010 At the Gates of Loyang
2011 Expedition Sumatra
2012 Grimoire
2013 The Palaces of Carrara
2014 Linko!
2015 Alchemists
2016 My First Stone Age

References

External links
 BoardGameGeek Article on the Essen Feather
 Official winners list 

Board game awards